Choate is a surname. Notable people with the surname include:

Anne Hyde Choate (1886–1967), early Girl Scout leader
Charles Edward Choate (1865–1929), American architect
Clyde L. Choate (1920–2001), American politician
Don Choate (born 1938), former American professional baseball player
Emett Clay Choate (1891–1974), American lawyer
George Cheyne Shattuck Choate (1827–1896), American physician
Jeff Choate (born 1970), American football head coach for the Montana State Bobcats
Joseph Hodges Choate (1832–1917), American lawyer and politician
Joseph H. Choate Jr. (1876–1968), American lawyer
Mark Choate, history professor at Brigham Young University
Matthew Choate (born 1971), legislator in the Vermont senate
Nathaniel Choate (1899–1965), American painter and sculptor
Pat Choate (born 1941), American economist and politician
Putt Choate (born 1956), former linebacker in the NFL
Randy Choate (born 1975), American baseball pitcher
Robert B. Choate Jr. (1924–2009), American businessman and political activist
Rufus Choate (1799–1859), American lawyer and orator
Tim Choate (1954–2004), American actor
William Gardner Choate (1830–1920), United States federal judge